U3 small nucleolar ribonucleoprotein protein IMP3 is a protein that in humans is encoded by the IMP3 gene.

Function 

This gene encodes the human homolog of the yeast Imp3 protein. The protein localizes to the nucleoli and interacts with the U3 snoRNP complex. The protein contains an S4 domain.

References

Further reading

Sources
http://www.imp3.org/